Cyrtocaryidae is a family of ciliates of the order Apostomatida.

References 

Oligohymenophorea
Ciliate families